The Leicester Falcons are an American football team based in Leicester, Leicestershire, England, that competes in the BAFA National Leagues Premier Division North, the top level of British American football. The club currently operate from the Leicester Forest East Rugby Club, having vacated De Montfort Park in Hinckley at the end of the 2018 season.

The club are four-time Divisional champions and were promoted to the Premier North in 2019 but were relegated back down to Division 1 after a season. The club also operate Junior kitted sides and a development team the Leicester Falcons B who operate at BAFA Associate level. The club also absorbed the BAFANL Women's side the Derby Braves into their organisation, duly rebranding them as the Falcons women's team.

History
The Leicester Falcons were formed in 2006 by general weapon Guy Kersey and a nucleus of local players hoping to share their enjoyment and knowledge of the sport. Named in connection with Leicester Eagles, the regional flag football team, the Leicester Falcons held their first training session at Belgrave Rugby Club on 19 March 2006.  After two seasons of associate membership, the Falcons achieved full membership of the British American Football League prior to the 2008 season.

The Falcons' first season in BAFL Division 2 Central ended with a 3–5–2 record, under head coach Danny Gaunt.

The 2009 season proved to be much better, with a regular season record of 7–2–1.  Lester Hopewell took over as head coach, and led the Falcons to a playoff place. In the playoffs the Falcons beat Manchester Titans and Glasgow Tigers to reach their first championship game.  In a tight game Leicester Falcons defeated Colchester Gladiators 33:32 to become the BAFL Division 2 Champions for 2009. This also secured promotion for the Falcons to play in BAFA Community Leagues Division 1.

The 2010 season contained a number of highlights. The team celebrated the 25th anniversary of the Leicester charity LOROS by holding their league match against Birmingham Bulls at the Welford Road ground of Leicester Tigers.  To crown the day the Falcons won a well-fought game to claim their first victory of the season 22 :15.  To bolster the team for the second half of the season the team signed ex-NFL quarterback Bradlee Van Pelt, who had previously played for Denver Broncos and subsequently Houston Texans.  This had the desired effect and helped an improving team to win its next four matches and secure a wildcard place in the 2010 season play-offs. Despite having a weakened team the Falcons made the number 1 seeded team, East Kilbride Pirates, work very hard to secure their place in the semifinals; the Falcons lost a close fought game by only two points.

Following a realignment of the teams in BAFACL Division 1 the Leicester Falcons played in the Central Conference in 2011.  This proved to be a successful season for the Falcons, who finished top of the conference with a 9–1 record.  However, in a controversial ending to the season, BAFANL stripped the Falcons of the conference title and deducted one game after being found to have not followed proper transfer procedure in the transfer of Jason Brisbane. The Falcons therefore entered the playoffs as the #4 seed.  In the playoffs, the Falcons beat Doncaster Mustangs in the quarterfinals, before a famous upset win against top seeds London Olympians in the semifinal, to set up a rematch with East Kilbride Pirates at Britbowl XXV. This ended in a 62–23 defeat.

Following a divisional restructure, BAFA confirmed that the Falcons would be promoted to an expanded Premier Division for 2012, and will play in the Premier Division North.  The Falcons began the season with two wins and a loss, before a controversial match against Doncaster Mustangs. Leicester won the match, but the result was overturned after BAFA determined the Falcons had fielded ineligible players. The fallout from this led to numerous players leaving, and the Falcons had to forfeit their remaining games.  As a result, both head coach Stuart Franklin and interim GM Colin Branagh left their positions.  The only Falcons organisation team to complete their season were the U16 youth team, who finished their inaugural season with a credible 3–9 record.

2013-present
Following the Falcons' relegation from the Premier League after the previous season's ordeals, the Falcons organisation took a step back and began to rebuild their team from the ground up.  Following Ex-Chairman Guy Kersey's departure to the USA, Saul Freer took over as the Club's Chairman and began a second stint as Head Coach of the team, leading a new player-run committee.

The new-look team, consisting mainly of rookie players, won their first game against Crewe Railroaders 34–26. The 2013 was a season of ups and downs, with an inexperienced squad the team played with a level of inconsistency, beating a number of teams handily, but managing to lose against some of the more experienced teams by large margins.

The Falcons finished the season with a 3-game win streak, clinching hard-fought wins against long-standing rivals the Shropshire Revolution, Crew Railroaders and Lincolnshire Bombers to finish the season 6-4.

After a productive 2013 the Falcons have stated they are looking to build on last season's successes, and are actively seeking new players with or without experience to join the team. The Leicester Falcons will once again be taking the field in 2014, supporting three different ages of football.
Senior (18+)
Junior (16-19)
Youth (13-16)

The 2015 season saw the return of Guy Kersey and Head Coach Lester Hopewell, as well as a move to a new home ground, Leicester Road Stadium at De Montfort Park, Hinckley. The Falcons qualified for the playoffs with a 7-3-0 regular season record, before succumbing to a 21-6 defeat to the Sandwell Steelers.

Following a return to the playoffs in the 2015 season, the Falcons carried that momentum through the 2016 season, achieving an undefeated 10-0 regular season, leading the country in both points scored (497) and conceded (21). With home field advantage, the Falcons defeated division rivals Staffordshire Surge 60-0 and the Chester Romans 58-29 earning them a spot in the NFCII bowl game on 11 September. Travelling to Leeds to take on the second seeded Newcastle Vikings, Leicester rode out 36-0 winners, securing their 9th shutout victory of the season and completing the perfect record of 13-0-0. The team earned promotion and competed in Division 1 for the 2017 season, setting up local rivalries with the likes of Sandwell, Birmingham and Coventry. With Noel Cassar taking over as Head Coach, the Falcons dominated NFC1 South, finally overcoming their bogey team Sandwell Steelers and beating local rivals Coventry Jets and Nottingham Caesars on their way to a 9-1 regular season record. However, their season ended in the playoff semifinals as Manchester Titans visited Leicester Road and came away with a 27-21 victory.

The 2018 season proved to be the best ever. The Falcons carried on their dominance in the NFC1 South, going unbeaten throughout the season and won their first Division 1 title with a 36-29 victory over Kent Exiles, a second unbeaten season in three years. This ensured the Falcons returned to the top tier of football in 2019.

In 2021, the Falcons were able to sign all time leading Quarterback in the British game Mike Grossner.  The 50 year old QB was formerly Head Coach at Baker University Wildcats, but was dismissed due to financial irregularities.  
 
The Falcons have started well in 2022 by arranging to play an international fixture in Iceland.  Unfortunately due to poor leadership, the team had to cancel their journey as they decided to use the funds to cover the travel of the American Scholars at UWE Bullets so that they could play locally in Leicester.  Its probable that they may end up washing dishes at Orton's Brasserie to cover some of the investment laid down by Guy Kersey.  Understandlby first the team will need to overcome paying athletes who are residing on student Visa's.  But where there's a will, Guy will find a way.

Record

All-time regular season record 74-41-4

Includes one abandoned league game in 2008 and four forfeited games in 2012

All-time playoff record 12-4

All-time record (all games) 86-45-4

The Falcons Academy
As part of the team's continued growth and to help ensure its future, as well as to provide an entry point for teenagers who wish to enjoy the sport of American football, the Falcons are looking for the next generation of players to join the organisation.

The Falcons started a youth programme in the autumn of 2009 to fill the gap between junior Flag Football and adult contact football. In 2011, they entered the BAFACL Junior division for the first time and finished their inaugural season with a 1–7 record, with the sole win coming against Coventry Jets.  2011 also saw the debut of the Falcons' university team, in association with De Montfort University.

2012 saw the debut of an under 16 team, playing five a side contact football, and the restructure of the junior setup into the Falcons Academy. The youth team, coached by Karl Burgess and Joel Pearson, completed their first season with a 3–9 record.

2013 saw the Falcons Academy come on leaps and bounds, though the Falcons youth team returned only a handful of their players. Playing in a very competitive Midlands league, the Academy team played a number of successful teams, running eventual champions Birmingham Bulls close on a handful of occasions.  The Academy went on to post a very acceptable 7–5 record, unfortunately fell just short of reaching the playoffs.

2014 was the Academy's most successful season to date, with the U16 team winning their division and reaching the National Finals, where they finished the eighth ranked team in the country.

The club discontinued the Academy in 2015 due to low numbers, but relaunched the U16 Youth team in 2018 in conjunction with local school Fullhurst College. 

The Academy is led by Ryan Cummings, Neil Lynds and Lloyd Colver-Thompson.  The U16s team finished their debut season with 2 wins, beating the Birmingham Bulls during a home tournament and beat the Sandwell Steelers by default.

The Falcons have also just finished their first season at a U19 (Junior) level. Coming short in a couple of games they finished the season with a record of 1-1-4.

After a short hiatus due to Covid the U16 team completed the 2021 season with a 1-7 record. Their only win coming in the last game of the season against Rugby Rhinos. 

The 2022 season finished more successfully with a 3-5 record.

See also
 Leicester Panthers, predecessors to Leicester Falcons between 1984 and 1996

Notes

External links
 Leicester Falcons official website
 British American Football Association website
 BAFA Community Leagues website

American football teams in England
BAFA National League teams
Sport in Leicester
2006 establishments in England
American football teams established in 2006